Mary is an American comedy variety show hosted by and starring Mary Tyler Moore that aired Sundays at 8:00 pm (EST) on CBS from September 24 to October 8, 1978, with a total of three episodes aired over one season.

Synopsis
Mary was the attempt by Mary Tyler Moore to return to network television after the triumph of her sitcom (The Mary Tyler Moore Show) from 1970 to 1977. Her supporting cast included a repertory company of young actors and actresses, most notably Swoosie Kurtz, Dick Shawn, Michael Keaton, Judith Kahan, David Letterman and James Hampton, an orchestra led by Alf Clausen, and the Tony Stevens dancers.

Reception
Ratings were low and CBS cancelled Mary after only three episodes. It ranked 64th out of 114 shows that season with an average 16.1/25 rating/share.

References

Sources
 Brooks, Tim and Marsh, Earle, The Complete Directory to Prime Time Network and Cable TV Shows 1946–Present

External links
 

1978 American television series debuts
1978 American television series endings
1970s American variety television series
1970s American sketch comedy television series
CBS original programming
English-language television shows
Television series by MTM Enterprises